Caix is a commune in the Somme department in Hauts-de-France in northern France. Its 13th-16th century church is a listed monument.

Geography

First World War

In the First World War Caix was under German occupation for most of the period. It was recaptured by the 1st Canadian Division on 8 August 1918.

Population

See also
Communes of the Somme department

References

External links

 Caix on the Quid website 

Communes of Somme (department)